Sergio Francesco Momesso (born September 4, 1965) is a Canadian former professional ice hockey player who spent 13 seasons in the National Hockey League between 1983 and 1997.

Playing career
Momesso played his junior hockey for the Shawinigan Cataractes of the QMJHL, and was drafted 27th overall in the 1983 NHL Entry Draft by his hometown Montreal Canadiens. He made his NHL debut the following season at the age of 18, playing a single game for the Canadiens, but remained in junior for most of the following two seasons. In 1984–85, he recorded 56 goals and 146 points in 64 games, along with 216 penalty minutes, and was named QMJHL Player of the Year. 
 
For the 1985–86 NHL season, Momesso made the Habs' roster out of training camp and meshed well on a line with Brian Skrudland and Mike McPhee, recording 8 goals and 15 points in his first 24 games to start his career. However, he suffered a knee injury in December 1985 against the Boston Bruins that shelved him for the rest of the season; it also cost him an opportunity to engrave his name on the Stanley Cup as Montreal went on to win that season.  Montreal still include Momesso on the 1986 Montreal Canadiens team winning picture, and gave him a Stanley Cup ring.

Momesso would spend two more seasons in Montreal but never recaptured the form of his rookie year. At the conclusion of the 1987–88 season, he was dealt to the St. Louis Blues in a multi-player trade.

After his first season in St. Louis during which he recorded 26 points in 53 games, Momesso's career took an upward turn in 1989–90 when he was placed on a line with Brett Hull and Adam Oates. Spending much of the season on the Blues' top line, Momesso turned in the most productive year of his career, finishing with 24 goals and 32 assists for 56 points, along with 199 penalty minutes. However, he would lose his spot on the top line in 1990–91, and recorded just 10 goals through his first 59 appearances.

Vancouver Canucks
At the trade deadline in 1991, Momesso was dealt to the Vancouver Canucks in a six-player deal along with Geoff Courtnall, Cliff Ronning, and Robert Dirk for Garth Butcher and Dan Quinn. The deal would prove to favor Vancouver, as all four players they acquired would be significant contributors for several seasons. Momesso got his Canuck career off to a fine start, recording 6 goals in 11 games to help the team on a successful late-season push to qualify for the playoffs.

Momesso's stay in Vancouver would be the longest stop of his career. Through his first two seasons in Vancouver, he played largely on a line with Jim Sandlak and his former St. Louis teammate Cliff Ronning, with the two large wingers used to create space for Ronning. (As a result, the line would be known as 'the Twin Towers'). In 1991–92, he played some of the best hockey of his career to finish with 20 goals and 43 points despite missing 26 games due to injury. In 1992–93, he had another solid year to finish with 18 goals and 38 points, as well as a career-high 200 penalty minutes.

1993–94 would be a struggle for Momesso, as he finished with just 27 points, his lowest total since 1989. However, he redeemed himself in the 1994 playoffs, as his strong physical play on a line with Martin Gelinas and Nathan LaFayette was one of the catalysts for Vancouver's run to the Stanley Cup Finals. Along the way, he scored an overtime winner against the Dallas Stars.

After Vancouver
After a solid performance during the lockout-shortened 1994–95 season with 25 points in 48 games, Momesso was dealt to the Toronto Maple Leafs for Mike Ridley. He never found his legs in Toronto and was dealt after only 54 games to the New York Rangers, finishing the season with 11 goals and 23 points in 73 games. In 1996–97, he was dealt mid-season back to the St. Louis Blues, and finished the year with 1 goal and 4 points in 40 games.

Unable to get another NHL contract, Momesso signed with Kölner Haie in Germany and enjoyed four successful seasons in the DEL before retiring in 2001. He finished his NHL career with totals of 152 goals and 193 assists for 345 points in 710 games, along with 1557 penalty minutes. He never missed the NHL playoffs in his career, and recorded 18 goals and 26 assists for 44 points in 119 postseason games.

He returned to North America to act as an assistant coach at Concordia University and for Shawinigan. Momesso's family owns a restaurant in Montreal's Notre-Dame-de-Grâce district and Sergio has opened his own restaurant, Cafe Momesso.

On September 16, 2010, it was announced that Momesso would join the broadcast team with CJAD radio as colour commentator and game analyst for Montreal Canadiens broadcasts.

Momesso is now an analyst with TSN690 and regularly joins Off the Cuff with Chris Nilan on a weekly basis.

Personal life
Momesso's Italian-born father, Alessandro was an all-star soccer player in Montreal. Two of Momesso's nephews, Marco and Giulio Scandella, are professional ice hockey players.

Career statistics

Regular season and playoffs

Post playing media career
He has been giving radio commentary for Montreal Canadiens hockey on the English-language radio station with the play-by-play rights working for CJAD until the end of the 2010-2011 season.  For the 2011-2012 season, Team 990 the Montreal TSN Radio station obtained English language rights for games and Momesso currently provides commentary for them.

References

External links

Sergio Momesso profile at hockeydraftcentral.com
Official Website

1965 births
Canadian ice hockey left wingers
Canadian people of Italian descent
Ice hockey people from Montreal
Kölner Haie players
Living people
Montreal Canadiens draft picks
Montreal Canadiens players
New York Rangers players
Nova Scotia Voyageurs players
Nürnberg Ice Tigers players
St. Louis Blues players
Shawinigan Cataractes players
Toronto Maple Leafs players
Vancouver Canucks players
Anglophone Quebec people
Canadian expatriate ice hockey players in Germany